African Cookbook is an album by Randy Weston's African Rhythms. The set of quintet performances was recorded in Paris. It was released by Comet Records in 1969.

Track listing 
All compositions by Randy Weston except as indicated
 "African Cookbook" - 14:06     
 "A Night in Medina" - 4:43     
 "Jajouka" - 6:06     
 "Marrakech Blues" - 6:14     
 "Con Alma" (Dizzy Gillespie) - 4:49     
 "Afro Black" - 2:59

Personnel 
Randy Weston – piano
Henry Texier – bass
Art Taylor – drums
Azzedin Niles Weston, Reebop Kwaku Baah – percussion

References 

Randy Weston albums
1969 albums
Polydor Records albums